Mano or pagmamano is an "honoring-gesture" used in Filipino culture performed as a sign of respect to elders and as a way of requesting a blessing from the elder. Similar to hand-kissing, the person giving the greeting bows towards the hand of the elder and presses their forehead on the elder's hand. Usually performed with the right hand, the person showing respect may ask "Mano po" or "[Pa-]bless po" to the elder in order to ask permission to initiate the gesture. Typically someone may mano to their older relatives upon entry into their home or upon seeing them.

The word mano is Spanish for hand while the word po is often used in Filipino culture and language at the end of each sentence as a sign of respect when addressing someone older, akin to English (sir/ma'am). Put together, mano po literally translates to [your] hand please as the greeting initiates the gesture of touching the back of the hand of an elder lightly on one’s forehead. In Visayas the gesture is called amin and it is called siklod in Kapampangan. An identical tradition is followed in neighbouring Indonesia and Malaysia called salim and salam respectively, suggesting that the mano po tradition dates to pre-colonial times.

Historical accounts

Origin
The custom of mano dates from pre-colonial times and is still followed by the related countries of Indonesia, Malaysia, and Brunei, which the Philippines shares a common ethnolinguistic origin with. In these countries, however, the custom is called salim originating from Arabic. Salim is also done in the family to respect elder family members and relatives. Salim is also a normal gesture done in traditional Islamic society to respect the ulama (religious elite/scholars).

Usage and context
In today's Philippine setting, the mano is still used by Filipinos as a sign of respect to their elders. It is usually done when the elder is seen for the first time in the day or upon entering a house or gathering. There is no age limit for the usage of the mano, but it is usually practiced on those older by two generations or more.

By offering your hand to mano, you are allowing yourself to be subservient to the elder to accept their blessing and wisdom. It is considered impolite if one does not exercise the custom of pagmamano when entering the home of an elder or after seeing them at a gathering.

The respect for elders stems from the high value of family in Filipino culture. Filipinos are loyal to their family, such that the elderly live in the homes of their children and/or grandchildren to be taken care of, and the nursing home business is almost nonexistent in the Philippines. By having the elderly live at home, you are respecting their value in the family.

Though the mano po gesture is usually practiced on one's parents, grandparents, uncles, and aunts, it is not restricted to one’s relatives. Godparents are often greeted this way as well. During the Spanish colonial times, Catholic priests were also greeted like this, alongside the European practice of hand-kissing, and this still continues today often after a Catholic Mass, though the latter has fallen out of use.

The reason why Filipinos mano elders although they are not necessarily a relative is due to the value of family. Filipinos call older non-relatives "grandfather/mother, aunt, uncle, etc." even when they are not actually related in this way. By addressing elders in this way, you are acknowledging their age and the respect you need to show them. It is considered to be disrespectful to call an elder just by their first name. Filipinos treat friends and acquaintances like family.

The mano po gesture is usually followed by a response of "God bless you" or "May the Lord have mercy on you" by the elder; the sign of the cross may be made over the recipient. The latter response of "May the Lord have mercy on you" is used when the pagmamano is performed with both hands to ask for an elder's pardon and forgiveness. With both hands, the younger person takes the elder's hands and lifts them to the forehead to formally ask forgiveness for an offence. This may be done while kneeling and weeping and is the highest form of the pagmamano.

Similar Filipino customs

Beso-Beso
Though the mano po gesture is still widely used at present in the Philippines, many Filipinos have also replaced this gesture with the beso. The beso-beso which originated from the Spanish word for kiss, is a common greeting in the Philippines similar to the mano. The beso-beso is a cheek-to-cheek kiss. The beso is more commonly used amongst the upper classes as a greeting to relatives and close friends, but is not reserved for an older person unlike the mano.

Po and opo
Similar to the mano po gesture, po and opo are also distinctly Filipino ways of showing respect to one's elders. The po is usually affixed to the end of sentences or phrases when one is addressing someone older than him or her. For example, paumanhin in Filipino means sorry. To an elder, one would say paumanhin po, The word po alone has origins as a respectful honorific but in contemporary times, it does not carry its past implications anymore besides its contemporary meaning to add formality as a sign of respect. This is why it is affixed to mano and thus is said as mano po when one is requesting the blessing of an elder.

See also
 Filipino values
 Filipino character
 Filipino identity

References

Philippine traditions
Tagalog words and phrases
Gestures of respect
Greetings